Palca, Bolivia is a location in the La Paz Department in Bolivia. It is the seat of the Palca Municipality, the first municipal section of the Pedro Domingo Murillo Province.

References 

 Instituto Nacional de Estadistica de Bolivia

Populated places in La Paz Department (Bolivia)